Jin Homura (born 1948) is a Japanese painter. He works in oil paints, using the primary colors of red, yellow, and blue.

External links
Jin Homura's official home page 

1948 births
Living people
Japanese painters
Contemporary painters
Place of birth missing (living people)
Date of birth missing (living people)
20th-century Japanese painters